Stirling Island (also Sterling Island) is the smaller island of the Treasury Islands, Solomon Islands.

Geography
Stirling Island is separated from the largest Mono Island by Blanche Harbor. Stirling Island is composed of coral which was once part of the barrier reef surrounding Mono Island.

Population
Stirling Island has no permanent population. However an airfield and other remnants of World War II Allied base still remain here.

Air base

After the Allied Forces landed on Stirling, it became evident that the island was perfect for an airfield because the island was naturally flat, coral surfaced, with fresh water and good landing beaches locating nearby. A reconnaissance team from the 87th Naval Construction Battalion "Seabees" arrived on Stirling on November 1, 1943, to study the site, and four days later filed a favorable report about the area. Based on this report, a construction of a bomber strip "W", originally planned for Bougainville Island was initiated here.

In May 2011, Solomon Islands Prime Minister Danny Phillip repeated offers to the Australian Government to make the disused air base available to host the processing of asylum seekers.  It is believed that negotiations reached a reasonably advanced state before being discontinued.

References

External links
  The Treasury Islands Campaign

Islands of the Solomon Islands
Western Province (Solomon Islands)